Maximilian Büsser and Friends (MB&F) is a Swiss luxury watch and clock manufacturer founded by Maximilian Busser in July 2005 in Geneva, Switzerland. Maximilian Büsser and Friends specializes in small series of concept-type watches.  Maximilian Büsser and Friends is also known for its futuristic clocks and collaborations with other artists and watchmakers.

History

Maximilian Büsser and Friends was founded by Maximilian Büsser in July 2005 in Geneva, Switzerland. Maximilian Büsser and Friends launched its first watch, Horological Machine No.1 (HM1) in 2007. Maximilian Büsser and Friends has since launched more than 10 atypical 'horological machines'. In 2011, the brand presented Legacy Machine No.1 (LM1), the first in a collection of more traditional-looking, round-cased watches. In 2012, LM1 was awarded twice at the Grand Prix de l’Horlogerie de Genève (GPHG): Best Men's Watch and the Public Prize.

In 2008 Maximilian Büsser and Friends were granted a patent for a perpetual calendar mechanism which automatically corrects at the end of months having less than 31 days.

Notable models

In 2010 the HM4 Thunderbolt was awarded the Best Concept and Design Watch by the Grand Prix d'Horlogerie de Genève.

In 2012 the Legacy Machine No.1 was awarded both Best Men’s Watch Prize and the Public prize at the Grand Prix d'Horlogerie de Genève. 

thumb|200px|MB&F HM6
The Horological Machine No.6 (HM6) features a rounded biomorphic case, flying tourbillon under a retractable cover, and automatic winding. It displays hours and minutes on separate semi-spherical aluminum indication domes, crown to open/close a central flying tourbillon shield. It features hour and minute indications on domes, automatic winding regulated by twin turbines developed exclusively for HM6 by Maximilian Büsser and Friends and Davide Candaux Horlogerie Créative. In 2015 Horological Machine No.6 received a ‘Red Dot: Best of the Best" award – the top prize at the international Red Dot Awards.

In 2015, Maximilian Büsser and Friends presented Legacy Machine Perpetual featuring a new perpetual calendar architecture. LM Perpetual has a large-diameter suspended balance with traditional Breguet overcoil suspended over on the dial from twin arches with the complete perpetual calendar complication visible on full display above the movement plate. It displays hours, minutes, day, date, month, retrograde leap year and power reserve indicators. It has a fully integrated perpetual calendar developed for Maximilian Büsser and Friends by Stephen McDonnell, featuring dial-side complication and mechanical processor system architecture with inbuilt safety mechanisms. In 2016 Legacy Machine Perpetual won the Best Calendar Watch Prize" at the Grand Prix d’Horlogerie de Genève (GPHG).

Also in 2015 the HM6 Space Pirate was awarded the Best of the Best Red Dot prize.

In 2018, the company was awarded an Entrepreneurship prize by the Prix.

In 2019 Maximilian Büsser and Friends presented the brand's first ladies watch, the LM FlyingT It features a central three dimensional tourbillon movement, much of which is visible above the dial. The time is displayed on an inclined subdial at 7 o'clock. Hours and minutes are displayed on a 50° vertically tilted dial with two serpentine hands. Its movement is a three-dimensional vertical architecture, with automatic winding, conceived and developed in-house by Maximilian Büsser and Friends, central 60-second flying tourbillon, and 100-hour power reserve. In 2019, LM FlyingT won Best Ladies Complication at the Grand Prix d'Horlogerie de Genève (GPHG).

M.A.D. Gallery 
Büsser created the first Maximilian Büsser and Friends M.A.D. Gallery in 2011 in Geneva, Switzerland. "M.A.D." stands for Mechanical Art Devices. Büsser considers his timepieces to be kinetic art and created his own art gallery to display his sculptured Horological Machines in the context of mechanical art by other artists.

In addition to Geneva, there are now M.A.D. Galleries in Dubai, Taipei and Hong Kong.

See also 
 List of watch manufacturers
 Manufacture d'horlogerie

References 

Companies of Switzerland
Watch brands
Watches
Jewellery companies of Switzerland
Companies based in the canton of Geneva